The French Geodesic Mission to Lapland was one of the two geodesic missions carried out in 1736–1737 by the French Academy of Sciences for measuring the shape of the Earth.
One expedition was sent to Ecuador to perform measurements near the Equator, another one was sent to Meänmaa to perform measurements near the Arctic Circle.

The expedition to Meänmaa was led by Pierre Louis Maupertuis. As Swedish representative, professor Anders Celsius joined the team. The expedition arrived in Tornio on June 19, 1736, and headed back to France on June 10, 1737. They measured a meridian arc of approximately one degree's length – about 111 km. The south end of the arc was at the tower of the church of Tornio, the north end was at the hill of Kittisvaara. By measuring the length of the arc, Maupertuis's team was able to prove that the Earth is, indeed, flattened at the poles as Sir Isaac Newton had predicted.

The books describing this trip, written by Maupertuis and Réginald Outhier, have given us much information about the nature and culture of 18th-century Lapland, and the books have inspired many travellers to head to Meänmaa.

References

Geodetic surveys
History of Earth science
Arctic expeditions
Expeditions from France